Astragalus centralpinus is a species of milkvetch in the family Fabaceae.

Synonyms
 Astragalus alopecuroides sensu auct.
 Astragalus alopecuroides var. hookeri Pamp.
 Astragalus alopecuroides var. typicus Pamp.
 Astragalus alopecuroides var. winterlii Pamp.
 Astragalus alopecurus var. maximus (Willd.) Trautv.
 Astragalus alopecurus var. pallasiana Trautv.
 Astragalus dasysemius (D.F.Chamb. & V.A.Matthews) Ponert
 Astragalus dzhawakheticus Bordz.
 Astragalus maximus Willd.
 Astragalus maximus var. dasysemius D.F.Chamb. & V.A.Matthews
 Astragalus maximus. var. oblongiceps Manden.
 Tragacantha alopecurus (Pall.) Kuntze
 Tragacantha maxima (Willd.) Kuntze

Description
The hairy stem has a diameter of about 10 mm. Leaflets are ovate to elliptic, in 20-25 pairs. The inflorescences are in clusters subsessile or with peduncle up to 1 cm, ovoid to cylindrical, while bracts reach . Petals are yellow and glabrous. This plant blooms from June to August.

Distribution
This species is present in Armenia, Azerbaijan, Bulgaria, China, France, Italy, Kazakhstan, Russia and Turkey.

Habitat

References
USDA Plants Profile
Luirig altervista
Flora of China
Catalogue of life

centralpinus